Osmotherley is a  civil parish in South Lakeland, Cumbria, England, extending north from Ulverston. The village of Broughton Beck is the largest settlement in the parish. Before local government reorganization in 1974, Osmotherley was in Lancashire. Since 2003 it has a joint parish council with Mansriggs and Egton with Newland.

The only listed building in the parish is St John the Evangelist's Church (grade II).

At the 2011 census Osmotherley was grouped with Mansriggs giving a total population of 302.

References

External links
 Cumbria County History Trust: Osmotherley (nb: provisional research only – see Talk page)
  

 Osmotherley: historical and genealogical information at GENUKI

Villages in Cumbria
Civil parishes in Cumbria
South Lakeland District